George Michael Walker (October 14, 1939 – July 19, 2014) was an American football offensive lineman and linebacker in the National Football League. He played five seasons for the New York Giants (1961–1965) getting to the championship game and losing twice.  Walker ended his career after getting injured in the pre-season for the Detroit Lions.

Walker attended East Detroit High School in Eastpointe, Michigan.  While there he played football on a team that included Gary Ballman and Ron Kramer. He is famous for a play where an opposing team's player broke his nose and he returned into the game the next play and broke that player's leg.  Walker is in the hall of fame at East Detroit High School for football.  Walker played college football for Michigan State University where he is in the hall of fame for football.

After professional football, Walker went on to be a physical education teacher at Anchor Bay Elementary School and Anchor Bay Junior High School in New Baltimore, Michigan in the 1970s, 1980s, and 1990s.  He also purchased the Little Country Club in Pearl Beach, Michigan and changed the name of the 9-hole golf course to Mickey Walker's Little Country Club.

 Picture I found

References

1939 births
2014 deaths
People from Petoskey, Michigan
Players of American football from Michigan
American football centers
American football offensive guards
American football linebackers
Michigan State Spartans football players
New York Giants players
People from New Baltimore, Michigan
Sportspeople from Metro Detroit